Daniel or Dan Williams may refer to:

Sports
 Daniel Williams (cricketer) (born 1981), English cricketer
 Daniel Williams (judoka) (born 1989), British judoka
 Daniel Williams (footballer, born 2001), Welsh footballer

 Dan Williams (defensive end) (born 1969), American football defensive end
 Dan Williams (defensive tackle) (born 1987), American football defensive tackle
 Dan Williams (rugby union) (born 1989), English rugby union player

Politicians
 Daniel Williams (governor-general) (born 1935), Governor-General of Grenada
 Dan Williams (Alabama politician) (1942–2015), served in the Alabama House of Representatives
 Dan K. Williams (born 1956), serving in the Pennsylvania House of Representatives
 Dan Williams (Canadian politician)

Musicians
 Daniel Williams (born 1985), American drummer for the band The Devil Wears Prada
 Daniel Lewis Williams, American operatic basso profundo

Other
 Daniel Williams (historian) (1932–2010), American archivist and historian
 Daniel Williams (theologian) (1643–1716), Welsh theologian
 Daniel Hale Williams (1858–1931), American surgeon
 Daniel Day Williams (1910–1973), American theologian, professor, and author
 Daniel Barclay Williams, American educator

See also 
 Danny Williams (disambiguation)